Bab al-Maqam, meaning the Gate of Maqam is one of the Gates of Aleppo. 

The 13th century structure was built by al-Aziz Muhammad on the road that connected the Maqamat with the Citadel. 

Deviations in its design from the majority of medieval Syrian gates suggest that its function was ceremonial rather than military.  

In Constructions of Power and Piety in Medieval Aleppo (1997), Yasser Tabbaa details some of these differences, noting that they reinforce the possibility that the gate had primarily a religious and political function, serving as homage to Abraham and contrasting with the eastern shrines of Mashhad al-Dikka and Mashhad al-Husayn.

References

Ziyarat
Maqam